Chone Canton is a canton of Ecuador, located in the Manabí Province.  Its capital is the town of Chone.  Its population at the 2001 census was 117,634.

Demographics
Ethnic groups as of the Ecuadorian census of 2010:
Mestizo  68.8%
Montubio  20.4%
Afro-Ecuadorian  6.4%
White  4.1%
Indigenous  0.1%
Other  0.2%

References

Cantons of Manabí Province